Apibacter adventoris is a mesophilic bacterium from the genus of Apibacter which has been isolated from honey bees.

References

Flavobacteria
Bacteria described in 2016